Kujtesa is a telecommunications company in Kosovo. The company was founded in 1995 as a small business that offered general IT services such as backing up CDs to computers, sales, and repairs. During the war of 1999, the company lost most of its assets and capital. Kujtesa later became one of the initial ISPs in Kosovo. Today, Kujtesa provides internet, networking, cable TV, IPTV, and VoIP services.

History 

1995

"Kujtesa" is established as a retailer of computer equipment.

2000

Wireless data network is implemented in Prishtina.

2006

Entering the market of cable operator in Kosovo.

2012

Launch of the Sports channels platform.

2016

Expansion of the network in rural areas (about 98% of the territory of Kosovo).

2021

Collaboration with ArtMotion.

References

Cable television companies
Telecommunications companies of Kosovo
Kosovo companies